The Way I Really Play (also released as The Great Oscar Peterson on Prestige!) is a 1968 album by jazz pianist Oscar Peterson. It is the third part of Peterson's Exclusively for My Friends series.

Reception

Writing for AllMusic, critic Ken Dryden wrote "The influence of Art Tatum is apparent during his intricate runs within "Love Is Here to Stay," while the multifaceted original "Sandy's Blues" (dedicated to his wife) combines a dark mood with a swinging setting. The lighthearted waltzing treatment of "Alice in Wonderland" is pure joy, while another original, "Noreen's Nocturne," is simply a showstopper."

The Penguin Guide to Jazz includes the album in its selected "Core Collection."

Track listing
 "Waltzing Is Hip" (Ray Brown, Johnny Wayne) – 6:11 	 
 "Satin Doll" (Duke Ellington, Johnny Mercer, Billy Strayhorn) – 10:05  	 
 "Love Is Here to Stay" (George Gershwin, Ira Gershwin) – 4:54
 "Sandy's Blues" (Oscar Peterson) – 9:34
 "Alice in Wonderland" (Sammy Fain, Bob Hilliard) – 4:46
 "Noreen's Nocturne" (Oscar Peterson) – 9:20

Personnel

Performance
Recorded at the private studio of Hans Georg Brunner-Schwer, Villingen-Schwenningen, West Germany, November 12, 1967:

 Oscar Peterson – piano
 Sam Jones – double bass
 Bobby Durham – drums

Production
 Recording director and engineer - Hans Georg Brunner-Schwer
 Liner notes - Gene Lees
 Liner notes translated - Dr. B. Falk
 Cover photography - Sepp Werkmeister
 Reverse side photography - Sepp Werkmeister
 Graphic work - Hans B. Piltzer

References

Oscar Peterson albums
1968 albums
MPS Records albums